Eberhard Hermann Wilhelm Kube (19 April 1936 – 22 February 2022) was a German mime artist.

Born in Berlin-Lichtenberg, Brandenburg, Prussia, Germany, Kube died in Wrechen, Mecklenburg-Vorpommern, Germany, on 22 February 2022, at the age of 85.

Partial filmography 
 1964: Die Suche nach dem wunderbunten Vögelchen
 1964: Harlekin, Pantalone und wir (Kurzfilm)
 1971: Faxenmacher
 1976: Mario und der Zauberer (Mário a kúzelník)
 1978: Electra (Kurzfilm)
 1978: Der besondere Tag
 1982: Die Horatier und die Kuriatier
 1982: Der Diener zweier Herren

References 

1936 births
2022 deaths
Artists from Berlin
East German artists
German mimes
German theatre directors